Vengeur (Avenger) was a French Navy  of the M5 ​​series commissioned in 1931. She participated in World War II on the side of the Allies until June 1940, and then in the naval forces of Vichy France until she was scuttled in 1942.

Characteristics

Vengeur was part of a fairly homogeneous series of 31 deep-sea patrol submarines also called "1,500-tonners" because of their displacement. All entered service between 1931 and 1939.

They displaced  on the surface and  underwater. When submerged, their two electric motors produced a combined  and allowed them to reach .

Construction

Constructed under the 1924 program as a submarine of the M5 series, Vengeur was laid down at Arsenal de Cherbourg in Cherbourg, France, on 11 January 1926 with the hull number Q137 and launched on 1 September 1928.

Service history

1931–1939

At the end of her sea trials but before she was commissioned, Vengeur made a lengthy voyage accompanied by her sister ship . Departing Cherbourg on 3 March 1930, the submarines made stops in French Morocco, Senegal, the West Indies, and the United States before returning to France in June 1930. They were the first French submarines to cross the Atlantic Ocean.

On 17 June 1931, Vengeur arrived in Brest, France, and she visited Brest again on 20 September 1931. She finally was commissioned on 18 December 1931.

In the Mediterranean Sea off Cap Sicié near Toulon, France, Vengeur took part on 23 April 1937 in the testing of a tracking device which made it easier to locate an airplane or airmen who had come down at sea by creating a fluorescent layer that airplane crews could see.

World War II

French Navy
When World War II began in September 1939, Vengeur was assigned to the 7th Submarine Division based at Cherbourg, attached to the maritime prefecture there. Redoutable made up the rest of the division. The submarines operated in the English Channel and North Sea.

German ground forces advanced into France on 10 May 1940, beginning the Battle of France, and Italy declared war on France on 10 June 1940 and joined the invasion. On the day Italy entered the war, Vengeur departed Bizerte, Tunisia, to patrol off the Cani Islands off Bizerte and protect the Tunisian coast from an Italian amphibious landing. From 13 to 21 June 1940 she patrolled off Palermo in Sicily, Salerno in Italy, and Cagliari in Sardinia. The Battle of France ended in France's defeat and armistice with Germany and Italy which went into effect on 25 June 1940.

Vichy France

After France's surrender, Vengeur served in the naval forces of Vichy France. She was assigned to the 7th Submarine Division and based at Toulon.

In September 1940, the Vichy French Admiralty, with the concurrence of the Armistice Commission, decided to reinforce French naval forces in Southeast Asia by deploying four submarines to French Indochina. On 11 October 1940, Vengeur and L'Espoir departed Toulon bound for Oran in Algeria in company with the tanker , which was to accompany the four submarines on their journey to French Indochina. At Oran they rendezvoused with Monge and Pégase, and Lot and the four submarines were designated the "Lot Group" for purposes of the voyage. Monge′s commanding officer, who also served as commander of the 22nd Submarine Division, took on the additional responsibility of commanding the Lot Group as a whole. They then proceeded to Dakar in Senegal.

On 23 October 1940, the submarines got underway from Dakar to patrol off the Canary Islands. They encountered very heavy weather, and Pégase suffered damage to one of her diving planes. The submarines returned to Dakar on 28 October 1940. From 5 to 7 November 1940, Vengeur and her sister ship  operated south of Cabo de Gata, Spain, to reconnoiter Gibraltar.

On 17 December 1940, Lot and the four submarines got underway from Dakar to continue the voyage to French Indochina, with their next stop at Madagascar. Bad weather helped to conceal them from detection by the British, and they rounded the Cape of Good Hope without incident. They encountered a tropical cyclone as they approached Madagascar, and anchored at Tamatave, Madagascar, on 15 January 1941. A second cyclone struck Tamatave on the day of their arrival, and Monge and Pégase  in particular faced its more severe effects, but Vengeur also suffered damage. Monge and Pégase  got underway for Diego-Suarez in northern Madagascar on 16 January 1941. L'Espoir, Vengeur and Lot departed Tamatave on 22 January 1941 to join them at Diego-Suarez. A lack of docking space at Diego-Suarez delayed their arrival, but the three vessels finally moored at Diego-Suarez on 2 February 1941, and Vengeur entered drydock there on 11 February 1941 for repairs. 

The submarines' departure for French Indochina was delayed when the commanding officer of Monge, who also served as commander of the 22nd Submarine Division and of the Lot Group as a whole, became extremely intoxicated and began to show the early signs of a nervous breakdown. Although Lot, Monge, and Pégase departed Diego-Suarez on 16 February 1941 to begin the last leg of their voyage to French Indochina, the plans for L'Espoir and Vengeur to deploy to French Indochina were cancelled, and they remained behind in Madagascar.

After the completion of her repairs, Vengeur returned to an active operational status at Diego-Suarez on 3 March 1941. On 6–7 March 1941 she made a training outing in the waters off Diego-Suarez, and on 12 March 1941 she got underway to search for the French cargo ship Francois L.D., which was on a voyage from Dakar to Madagascar. She returned to Diego-Suarez on 19 March 1941 without having found the ship.

On 28 March 1941, Vengeur departed Diego-Suarez for a "representation" visit to Réunion. She arrived at Saint-Paul on 30 March 1941, becoming the first French Navy vessel to visit Réunion since the June 1940 armistice. She moved to Port des Galets on 31 March 1941 and remained there until 7 April, receiving over 1,000 visitors on board during her stay. She got back underway on 7 April and made a demonstration dive off Saint-Denis, then circled the island on the surface at low speed to show the French colors. She then departed Réunion's waters and made for Diego-Suarez, which she reached on 10 April 1941. She had covered  since leaving Diego-Suarez 13 days earlier. She began repairs at Diego-Suarez which lasted until the end of April 1941 and included a stint in drydock from 16 to 18 April.

Vengeur got underway from Diego-Suarez on 10 May 1941 to conduct an escort mission. She called at Tamatave from 12 to 14 May 1941 to rendezvous with the cargo ship Eridan, which she was ordered to escort as far as the parallel of Durban, South Africa — 30 degrees South, which the French defined as the operational limit of Madagascar-based submarines. In a Force 6 storm with heavy seas, Vengeur was forced to abandon the escort of Eridan on 18 May 1941, but she proceeded to the waters off the Cape of Good Hope in an effort to rendezvous with the cargo ship Compiègne — which was on a voyage from Dakar to Madagascar – and escort her the rest of the way to Madagascar. Unable to find Compiègne, Vengeur turndd back for Madagascar, where she made stops at Fort-Dauphin from 23 to 27 May, Tulear from 29 to 30 May, and Majunga from 2 to 8 June before returning to Diego-Suarez on 10 June 1941. She was drydocked there on 11 June 1941 for hull repairs.

On 13 June 1941, negotiations between the Vichy French governor of French Somaliland and British authorities in the Aden Protectorate broke down, prompting the French Admiralty to order French naval forces in Madagascar to begin supply missions to Djibouti in French Somaliland, which the British were blockading. Vengeur received orders on 29 June 1941 to make the first voyage to Djibouti and achieve three results: create a submarine threat to British forces in the Djibouti-Obock-Aden area, deliver supplies to French Somaliland, and maintain the morale of people in French Somaliland. After passing Cape Guardafui on the coast of British-occupied Italian Somaliland on 26–27 July 1941 and entering the Gulf of Aden, she operated submerged by day. Vengeur arrived at Djibouti at 13:00 on 28 July 1941 and moored alongside the tanker . During the afternoon, she unloaded her cargo and drove off a British reconnaissance aircraft with antiaircraft fire. 

Vengeur began her return voyage during the evening of 28 July 1941. She passed Cape Guardafui on 31 July and reentered the Indian Ocean in heavy monsoon weather. The storm intensified, and she suffered significant damage, including five punctured ballast tanks. She reached Diego-Suarez on 8 August 1941, completing a  round-trip voyage, and began repairs which lasted three months.

After completion of her repairs, Vengeur was placed on alert on 25 November 1941 for another Djibouti mission. She arrived at Djibouti on 11 December 1941. After discharging her cargo, Vengeur patrolled in the Gulf of Tadjoura on 15 December, and on 22 December 1941 she covered the sea trials of Élorn. Vengeur and her sister ship  sortied from Djibouti on 31 December 1941 and on 6, 13, and 16 January 1942 to protect barge convoys making the passage between Djibouti and Obock. From 16 to 20 January 1942, Vengeur, Le Glorieux, and the aviso  conducted a patrol in the Gulf of Aden. Vengeur and D'Iberville then headed for Diego-Suarez, which they reached on 27 January 1942. Vengeur spent February 1942 in an alert status at Diego-Suarez.

Vengeur departed Madagascar on 16 March 1942, bound for France in company with L'Espoir. The submarines made an overnight stop at Tulear on 21–22 March 1942, where they met the French auxiliary cruiser . They next stopped at Dakar from 19 to 27 April, at Casablanca from 3 to 8 May, and at Oran from 10 to 11 May before arriving at Toulon on 13 May 1942, where they began repairs. They were disarmed and defueled at Toulon on 1 June 1942 in accordance with the terms of the 1940 armistice with Germany and Italy.

Loss
Vengeur was at Toulon's Northeast Missiessy Basin when Germany and Italy occupied the Free Zone of Vichy France on 27 November 1942, and she was among the French vessels scuttled at Toulon to prevent their seizure by Germany when German forces entered the naval base that day. Her wreck was scrapped from March to May 1943.

References

Footnotes

Bibliography

 
 
 
 

Redoutable-class submarines (1928)
1928 ships
Ships built in France
World War II submarines of France
Maritime incidents in November 1942
Lost submarines of France
World War II warships scuttled at Toulon
Shipwrecks of France
World War II shipwrecks in the Mediterranean Sea